Statistics of the 1993–94 Saudi First Division.

External links 
 Saudi Arabia Football Federation
 Saudi League Statistics
 Al Jazirah 4 April 1994 issue 8758 

Saudi First Division League seasons
Saudi Professional League
2